The 2022 wildfire season involves wildfires on multiple continents.

Below is a partial list of articles on wildfires from around the world in the year 2022.

Africa 
 2022 Moroccan wildfires

Europe 
2022 European and Mediterranean wildfires

North America 

United States
2022 Arizona wildfires
June 2022 Flagstaff wildfires
2022 Colorado wildfires
2022 California wildfires
2022 Idaho wildfires
Doubletapp Fire
Moose Fire
Elmo Fire
2022 Oregon wildfires
2022 New Mexico wildfires
2022 Texas wildfires
2022 Washington wildfires
Road 702 Fire

Asia 
Kazakhstan
2022 Kazakh wildfires

Mongolia
2022 Mongolian wildfires

Pakistan
2022 Khyber Pakhtunkhwa wildfires

Russia
2022 Siberian wildfires

South America 
Argentina
2022 Corrientes wildfires

Chile
2022 Araucanía wildfires
2022 Tierra del Fuego wildfire

Tierra del Fuego
2022 Tierra del Fuego wildfire

Australia
2021–22 Australian bushfire season

See also 
Weather of 2022

References 

 
2022